A ganzibra (singular form in , plural form in  , literally 'treasurer' in Mandaic) is a high priest in Mandaeism. Tarmidas, or junior priests, rank below the ganzibras.

Symbolically, ganzibras are considered to be uthras on earth (Tibil). Their responsibilities include performing masbuta, masiqta, wedding ceremonies, and other rituals, all of which can only be performed by priests. They must prepare their own food to maintain ritual purity. Ganzibra priests are also prohibited from consuming stimulants such as wine, tobacco, and coffee.

Ordination
The ganzibras go through an elaborate set of initiation rituals that are separate from those performed for the tarmidas. According Drower (1937), a ganzibra can only be initiated immediately before the death of a pious member of the Mandaean community. Two ganzibras and two shgandas are required to perform the initiation.

The bukra is the first masiqta performed by a ganzibra priest just after ordination.

Notable ganzibria
Notable ganzibria include:

 Brikha Nasoraia (Australia)

See also
 Mandaean priest
 Bishop
 Kohanim
 Rishama

References

External links
The Worlds of Mandaean Priests

Mandaic words and phrases
Mandaean titles